Liu Ding (Liú Dìng), Prince of Shanyang (Shānyángwàng), was a prince of the Han dynasty. He was the fourth son and heir of Liu Wu, prince of Liang. He did not receive all of his father's inheritance; instead, his uncle the emperor Jing divided the Liang Kingdom into five pieces. Liu Ding ruled Shanyang in 144–136 BC.

References

Prince of Shanyang